The grey-throated babbler (Stachyris nigriceps) is a species of passerine bird in the Old World babbler family Timaliidae.

It is found in Bangladesh, Bhutan, China, India, Indonesia, Laos, Malaysia, Myanmar, Nepal, Thailand, and Vietnam. Its natural habitats are subtropical or tropical moist lowland forest and subtropical or tropical moist montane forest.

Taxonomy
The grey-throated babbler was formally described in 1844 by the English zoologist Edward Blyth under the current binomial name Stachyris nigriceps. He specified the locality as Nepal. The genus name combines the Ancient Greek stakhus meaning "ear of wheat" and rhis, rhinos meaning "nostrils". The specific epithet nigriceps is from Latin niger meaning "black" and "-ceps" meaning "-headed".

Twelve subspecies are recognised:
 S. n. nigriceps Blyth, 1844 – central, east Himalayas
 S. n. coltarti Harington, 1913 – northeast India, north Myanmar and southwest China
 S. n. spadix Ripley, 1948 – east, south Assam (northeast India), east Bangladesh, south, southeast Myanmar and northwest, west Thailand
 S. n. yunnanensis La Touche, 1921 – east Myanmar, north Thailand and south China to north, central Indochina
 S. n. rileyi Chasen, 1936 – south Indochina
 S. n. dipora Oberholser, 1922 – north, central Malay Peninsula
 S. n. davisoni Sharpe, 1892 – south Malay Peninsula
 S. n. larvata (Bonaparte, 1850) – Sumatra and Lingga Island (east of central Sumatra)
 S. n. natunensis Hartert, EJO, 1894 – north Natuna Islands (northwest of Borneo)
 S. n. tionis Robinson & Kloss, 1927 – Tioman Island (off east Malay Peninsula)
 S. n. hartleyi Chasen, 1935 – montane west Borneo
 S. n. borneensis Sharpe, 1887 – montane north Borneo

References

Collar, N. J. & Robson, C. 2007. Family Timaliidae (Babblers)  pp. 70 – 291 in; del Hoyo, J., Elliott, A. & Christie, D.A. eds. Handbook of the Birds of the World, Vol. 12. Picathartes to Tits and Chickadees. Lynx Edicions, Barcelona.

grey-throated babbler
Birds of Eastern Himalaya
Birds of Southeast Asia
grey-throated babbler
grey-throated babbler
Taxonomy articles created by Polbot